Claudio Benjamín Naranjo Cohen (24 November 1932 – 12 July 2019) was a Chilean-born psychiatrist who is considered a pioneer in integrating psychotherapy and the spiritual traditions. He was one of the three successors named by Fritz Perls (founder of Gestalt Therapy), a principal developer of Enneagram of Personality theories and a founder of the Seekers After Truth Institute. He was also an elder statesman of the US and global human potential movement and the spiritual renaissance of the late 20th century. He was the author of various books.

Background and education

Naranjo was born in Valparaíso, Chile. He grew up in a musical environment and after an early start at the piano he studied musical composition. Shortly after entrance to medical school, he stopped composing as he became more involved in philosophical interests. Important influences from this time were Chilean visionary sculptor, philosopher and poet Tótila Albert Schneider (1892-1967), poet David Rosenmann-Taub, and Polish philosopher Bogumił Jasinowski (1883-1969).

Career

After graduating as a medical doctor in 1959, Naranjo was hired by the University of Chile Medical School to form part of a pioneering studies center in medical anthropology (CEAM) (Centro de Antropología Médica), founded by professor of physiology Franz Hoffmann (1902-1981). At the same time, he served his psychiatry residency at the University Psychiatry Clinic under the direction of Ignacio Matte Blanco.

Involved in research on the effects of traditional medical education, Naranjo traveled briefly to the United States during a mission assigned by the University of Chile to explore the field of perceptual learning. It is at that time that he became acquainted with the work of Samuel Renshaw and Hoyt Sherman at the Ohio State University.

In 1962, Naranjo was at Harvard as a visiting Fulbright scholar at the Center for Studies of Personality and Emerson Hall, where he was a participant in Gordon Allport's Social Psychology Seminar and a student of Paul Tillich. He became Raymond Cattell's associate at the Institute of Personality and Ability Testing (IPAT) in 1963. After a brief return to his native country, he was invited to Berkeley, California, for a year and a half to participate in the activities of the Institute of Personality Assessment and Research (IPAR).

After another period at the University of Chile Medical School's Center of Medical Anthropology Studies and at the Instituto de Psicología, Naranjo returned once again to Berkeley and to IPAR, where he continued his activities as a research associate. It was during this period of time that he became an apprentice of Fritz Perls and part of the early Gestalt Therapy community, where he began conducting workshops at Esalen Institute as a visiting associate. He eventually became one of Perls' three successors, along with Jack Downing  (1924-1993) and Robert Hall (1934-2019).

In the years that led up to his becoming a key figure at Esalen, Naranjo also received additional training and supervision from Jim Simkin in Los Angeles and attended sensory awareness workshops with Charlotte Selver. He became Carlos Castaneda's close friend and became part of Leo Zeff's pioneering psychedelic therapy group (1965–66). These meetings resulted in Naranjo’s contribution of the use of harmaline, MDA, and ibogaine.

In the 1960s, Naranjo introduced ibogaine and harmaline into psychotherapy as a "fantasy enhancing drug."

Richard Evans Schultes allowed for Naranjo to make a special journey by canoe up the Amazon River to study yage with the South American Indians. He brought back samples of this drug and published the first scientific description of the effects of its active alkaloids.

In 1969 he was sought out as a consultant for the Education Policy Research Center, created by Willis Harman at Stanford Research Institute. His report as to what in the domain of psychological and spiritual techniques in vogue was applicable to education later became his first book, The One Quest. During this same period, he co-authored a book with Robert Ornstein on meditation. Also, an invitation from Ravenna Helson to examine the qualitative differences between books representative of the "Matriarchal" and "Patriarchal" factors lead to his writing The Divine Child and the Hero, which would be published at a much later time.

The accidental death of his only son in 1970 marked a turning-point in his life. Naranjo set off on a six-month pilgrimage under the guidance of Oscar Ichazo (1931-2020), the founder of Arica school, who applied Enneagrams in his integral philosophy. Naranjo considered this spiritual retreat in the Atacama desert near Arica, Chile, to be the true beginning of his spiritual experience, contemplative life and inner guidance.

After leaving Arica, he began teaching a group that included his mother, Gestalt trainees and friends. This Chilean group, which began as an improvisation, took shape as a program and originated a non-profit corporation called the SAT Institute. These early years of the SAT Institute were implemented by a series of guest teachers, including Zalman Schachter, Ajahn Dhiravamsa (1934-2021), Yang Style Tai Chi Master Ch'u Fang Chu (Zhū Chǔ Fāng) (1912-1988), Sri Harish Johari (1934-1999), and Robert "Bob" Hoffman (1922-1997), originator of the Hoffman Quadrinity Process.

In 1976, Naranjo was a visiting professor at the Santa Cruz Campus of the University of California for two semesters and later intermittently at the California Institute of Asian Studies. He also began to offer workshops in Europe, refining aspects of the mosaic of approaches in the SAT program.

In 1987, he began the reborn SAT Institute in Spain for personal and professional development, with its program that includes Gestalt therapy and its supervision, applications of the Enneagram of Personality, interpersonal meditation, music as a therapeutic resource and as an extension of meditation, guided self-insight and communication processes. Since then, the SAT program has extended to Italy, Brazil, Mexico, and Argentina and more recently to France and Germany.

Since the late 1980s, Naranjo had divided each year between his activities abroad and his writing at home in Berkeley. Among his many publications, he revised an early book on Gestalt therapy and published two new ones. He published three books on the Enneagram of Personality, as well as The End of Patriarchy, which is his interpretation of social problems as the expression of a devaluation of the nurturance and human instinct and their solution in the harmonious development of our "three brained" potential. He also published a book on meditation, The Way of Silence and the Talking Cure, and Songs of Enlightenment on the interpretation of the great books of the West as expressions of "the inner journey" and variations on the "tale of the hero".

From the 1990s and onward he attended many education conferences and sought to influence the transformation of the educational system in various countries. It was his conviction that “nothing is more hopeful in terms of social evolution than the collective furthering of individual wisdom, compassion and freedom”. His book Changing Education to Change the World published in Spanish in 2004, was meant to stimulate the efforts of teachers among SAT graduates who are beginning to be involved in a SAT-in- Education project, that offers the staff of schools and the students in schools of education a "supplementary curriculum" of self-knowledge, relationship-repair and spiritual culture.

In 2006 the Foundation Claudio Naranjo was founded to implement his proposals regarding the transformation of traditional education into an education that does not neglect the human development that he believed our social evolution depends on.

His most recent book (2010), Healing Civilization: Bringing Personal Transformation into the Societal Realm through Education and the Integration of the Intra-Psychic Family, is both a continuation of and a turning point in Naranjo's lifelong work. For in this book, which has a foreword by Jean Houston, Naranjo explored what he saw as the root cause of the destruction of human civilization (as evidenced in the 2000s (decade) as war, violence, oppression of women, child abuse, environmental endangerment, etc.)—patriarchy—and brought both the problem and the solution home to an intra-psychic level. Patriarchy, he said, has taken root over millennia in the workings of our own conditioned minds. He also offered a remedy, which derives from the work of Tótila Albert regarding the "triune" being of our nature: the "Inner Father" (corresponding to the head), the "Inner Mother" (corresponding to the heart), and the "Inner Child" (corresponding to the instincts). As people learn to integrate these three "brains", Naranjo believed, they may bring about a functional, even divine, family within. And this, he believed, in addition to transforming education oriented to personal and collective evolution, could bring about the healing of civilization. In the Watkins' Mind Body Spirit Magazine he was listed as one of the 100 Most Spiritually Influential Living People of 2012.

Writings 
 On the Psychology of Meditation (1971) 
 The One Quest (1972) 
 The Healing Journey: New Approaches to Consciousness (1973)  
 Enneatypes and Psychotherapy 
 Enneatype Structures 
 Character and Neurosis 
 The End of Patriarchy 
 The Enneagram of Society 
 The Divine Child and the Hero 
 The Way of Silence and the Talking Cure 
 Techniques of Gestalt Therapy 
 Gestalt Therapy 
 Consciousness and Creativity 
 Transformation Through Insight 
 How To Be: Meditation in Spirit and Practice (1989)  
 Changing Education to Change the World
 Between Meditation and Psychotherapy
 Healing Civilization: Bringing Personal Transformation into the Societal Realm through Education and the Integration of the Intra-Psychic Family (2011) 
also published in French, German, Italian, Portuguese, and Spanish.

References

External links
 Naranjo's personal website
 Fundación Claudio Naranjo website
 Profile of Naranjo by Ginger Lapid-Bogda

                   

Anthropologists of religion
Chilean psychologists
Gestalt therapists
People from Valparaíso
Ibogaine activists
1932 births
2019 deaths
Psychedelic drug researchers
Chilean psychiatrists
Academic staff of the University of Chile
Harvard University alumni
Psychedelic drug advocates
Chilean Jews